Bebearia octogramma, the green-spotted forester, is a butterfly in the family Nymphalidae. It is found in eastern Nigeria, Cameroon, Gabon, the Republic of the Congo and the western part of the Democratic Republic of the Congo. The habitat consists of wet primary forests.

Adults feed on fallen fruit.

The larvae feed on an unidentified dicotyledonous tree.

References

Butterflies described in 1889
octogramma
Butterflies of Africa
Taxa named by Henley Grose-Smith
Taxa named by William Forsell Kirby